Cassiem is a South African surname that may refer to:
Dayaan Cassiem (b. 1998), a South African field hockey player
Junaid Cassiem (b. 1993), a South African former cricketer
Mustapha Cassiem (b. 2002), a South African field hockey player
Uzair Cassiem (b. 1990),  a South African rugby union player